Edward Plantagenet, 17th Earl of Warwick (25 February 1475 – 28 November 1499) was the son of Isabel Neville and George Plantagenet, 1st Duke of Clarence, and a potential claimant to the English throne during the reigns of both his uncle, Richard III (1483–1485), and Richard's successor, Henry VII (1485–1509). He was also a younger brother of Margaret Pole, 8th Countess of Salisbury. Edward was tried and executed for treason in 1499.

Life

Edward Plantagenet was the son of George Plantagenet, 1st Duke of Clarence and Isabel Neville, who was the elder daughter of Richard Neville, 16th Earl of Warwick. Edward was born on 25 February 1475 at Warwick, the family home of his mother. At his christening, his uncle King Edward IV stood as godfather. He was styled as Earl of Warwick from birth, but was not officially granted the title until after his father's death in 1478. His potential claim to the throne following the deposition of his cousin Edward V in 1483 was overlooked because of the argument that the attainder of his father barred Warwick from the succession (although that could have been reversed by an Act of Parliament). Despite this, he was knighted at York by Richard III in September 1483.

In 1480, Warwick was made a ward of King Edward IV's stepson, Thomas Grey, 1st Marquess of Dorset, who as his guardian had the power to decide whom he would marry.  Clements Markham, writing in 1906, claimed that Richard III had "liberated" Warwick from the Tower of London, where Dorset had placed him; however, there are no contemporary sources for this claim, although Dorset was Constable of the Tower. Dominic Mancini wrote that Richard, on becoming king, "gave orders that the son of the duke of Clarence, his other brother, then a boy of ten years old, should come to the city: and commanded that the lad should be kept in confinement in the household of his wife".

John Rous (died 1492) wrote that after the death of Richard III's only legitimate son, Edward of Middleham, Richard III named Warwick as heir to the throne; however, there is no other evidence for this, and historians have pointed out that it would be illogical for Richard to claim that Clarence's attainder barred Warwick from the throne while at the same time naming him as his heir.

Imprisonment and execution
Following the death on 16 March 1485 of Richard III's queen, Anne, young Edward Plantagenet was vested as Earl of Salisbury by right of his mother Isabel, who had been a co-heiress with Anne to the abeyant earldom. This provided Edward and thus his wards with more wealth and potential power. Following King Richard's death on 22 August 1485, Warwick, only ten years old, was kept as a prisoner in the Tower of London by Henry VII acting as his ward. His claim to the throne, albeit tarnished, remained a potential threat to Henry, particularly after the appearance of the pretender Lambert Simnel in 1487. In 1490, he was confirmed in his title of Earl of Warwick despite his father's attainder (his claim to the earldom of Warwick being through his mother). But he remained a prisoner until 1499, when he became involved (willingly or unwillingly) in a plot to escape with Perkin Warbeck.

On 21 November 1499, Warwick appeared at Westminster for a trial before his peers, presided over by John de Vere, 13th Earl of Oxford. A week later, Warwick was beheaded for treason on Tower Hill. Henry VII paid for his body and head to be taken to Bisham Abbey in Berkshire for burial, using funds derived from Warwick's estate. It was thought at the time that Warwick was executed in response to pressure from Ferdinand II of Aragon and Isabella I of Castile, whose daughter, Catherine of Aragon, was to marry Henry's heir, Arthur. Catherine was said to feel very guilty about Warwick's death, and believed that her trials in later life were punishment for it.

A number of historians have claimed that Warwick had a mental disability. This conclusion appears  entirely based on the chronicler Edward Hall’s contention that Warwick’s lengthy imprisonment from a young age had left him "out of all company of men, and sight of beasts, in so much that he could not discern a goose from a capon."

Upon Warwick's death, the House of Plantagenet became extinct in the legitimate male line. However, the surviving sons of his aunt Elizabeth, Duchess of Suffolk, continued to claim the throne for the Yorkist line.

Ancestors

References

Plantagenet
Plantagenet
Executed people from Warwickshire
Executed royalty
Heirs to the English throne
Edward, 17th Earl of Warwick
People executed under the Tudors for treason against England
People from Warwick
1475 births
1499 deaths
15th-century English nobility
People executed by Tudor England by decapitation
People executed under Henry VII of England
Executions at the Tower of London
15th-century executions by England
Burials at Bisham Abbey
Barons Monthermer
Barons Montagu
Non-inheriting heirs presumptive